was a Japanese Nippon Professional Baseball player.

External links

1952 births
Living people
Japanese baseball players
Japanese expatriate baseball people in the United States
Managers of baseball teams in Japan
Nippon Professional Baseball infielders
Baseball people from Shizuoka Prefecture
Taiyō Whales players
Yokohama DeNA BayStars managers
Yokohama Taiyō Whales players